2002 Czech Lion Awards ceremony was held on 2 March 2003.

Winners and nominees

Non-statutory Awards

References

2002 film awards
Czech Lion Awards ceremonies